Dervishi is a
Uyghur music band in Kazakhstan. 
The group was founded in Almaty, Kazakhstan in July 1999 by four musicians: Dilmurat Baharov, Adil Zhambakiev, Aziz Massimov and Raim Khamrayev. In 1999, the band received an award for the best music arrangement for the song Zharkent Gardens at the International Music Festival Voice of Asia (Kazakh: Азия Даусы, Russian: Голос Азии) and prize of Golden Dombra for the competition of the seven best Kazakhstan songs within the festival. The group is a Golden Disk winner in 2000, 2001, 2002, 2003 and have toured in Hungary, Bulgaria, Uzbekistan, Kyrgyzstan, Turkey, Azerbaijan, India, Thailand producing 5 albums, 2 VCDs, 2 DVDs, and 2 musical-fairy tales.

See also
Uyghurs in Kazakhstan

External links
Official website in Russian

Uyghurs
Uyghur music